Rickettsia raoultii is a tick-borne pathogenic spotted fever group Rickettsia species borne by Dermacentor ticks.

References

Further reading

Selmi, Marco, et al. "Rickettsia slovaca and Rickettsia raoultii in Dermacentor marginatus ticks collected on wild boars in Tuscany, Italy." Journal of Medical Entomology 46.6 (2009): 1490–1493.

External links
LPSN

Type strain of Rickettsia raoultii at BacDive -  the Bacterial Diversity Metadatabase

Rickettsiaceae